The reddish-winged bare-eye (Phlegopsis erythroptera) is a species of insectivorous passerine  bird in the antbird family, Thamnophilidae.
It is found in Bolivia, Brazil, Colombia, Ecuador, Peru, and Venezuela.
Its natural habitat is subtropical or tropical moist lowland forests.

The reddish-winged bare-eye was described by the English  bird artist and ornithologist John Gould in 1855 and given the binomial name Formicarius erythroptera.

This species is a specialist ant-follower that relies upon swarms of army ants to flush insects and other arthropods out of the leaf litter.

References

reddish-winged bare-eye
Birds of the Bolivian Amazon
Birds of the Colombian Amazon
Birds of the Ecuadorian Amazon
Birds of the Peruvian Amazon
Birds of the Venezuelan Amazon
reddish-winged bare-eye
Taxonomy articles created by Polbot